Melanoma Research is a bimonthly peer-reviewed medical journal published by Lippincott Williams & Wilkins and the editor-in-chief is F.J. Lejeune. It was established in 1991. The journal covers both experimental and clinical research on melanoma.

Abstracting and indexing
According to the Journal Citation Reports, the journal has a 2020 impact factor of 3.599.

References

External links
 

Bimonthly journals
English-language journals
Oncology journals
Publications established in 1991
Lippincott Williams & Wilkins academic journals